Baengma Station is a railway station on the Gyeongui-Jungang Line. It is located in Madu-dong, Ilsan, the city of Goyang.

External links
 Station information from Korail

Seoul Metropolitan Subway stations
Railway stations opened in 1966
Metro stations in Goyang